SM U-67 was a Type U 66 submarine or U-boat for the German Imperial Navy during the First World War. She had been laid down in November 1913 as U-8 the second boat of the U-7 class for the Austro-Hungarian Navy but was sold to Germany, along with the others in her class, in November 1914.

The submarine was ordered as U-8 from Germaniawerft of Kiel as the second of five boats of the U-7 class for the Austro-Hungarian Navy. After the outbreak of World War I in August 1914, the Austro-Hungarian Navy became convinced that none of the submarines of the class could be delivered to the Adriatic via Gibraltar. As a consequence, the entire class, including U-8, was sold to the German Imperial Navy in November 1914. Under German control, the class became known as the U 66 type and the boats were renumbered; U-8 became U-67, and all were redesigned and reconstructed to German specifications. U-67 was launched in May 1915 and commissioned in August.

A part of the IV Flotilla throughout the war, U-67 sank 17 ships with a combined gross register tonnage (GRT) of 39,720 in thirteen war patrols. On 20 November 1918, nine days after the Armistice, U-67 was surrendered to the British. She was broken up in 1921 at Fareham.

Design and construction 
After the Austro-Hungarian Navy had competitively evaluated three foreign submarine designs, it selected the Germaniawerft 506d design, also known as the Type UD, for its new U-7 class  of five submarines. The Navy ordered five boats on 1 February 1913.

The U-7 class was seen by the Austro-Hungarian Navy as an improved version of its U-3 class, which was also a Germaniawerft design. As designed for the Austro-Hungarian Navy, the boats were to displace  on the surface and  while submerged. The boats were designed with five  torpedo tubes; four located in the bow, one in the stern. The boats' armament was to also include a single  L/26 deck gun.

U-8 and sister boat  were both laid down on 1 November 1913, the first two boats of the class begun. Her construction was slated to be complete within 29 to 33 months.

Neither U-8 nor any of her sister boats were complete when World War I began in August 1914. With the boats under construction at Kiel, the Austrians became convinced that it would be impossible to take delivery of the boats, which would need to be towed into the Mediterranean past Gibraltar, a British territory. As a result, U-8 and her four sisters were sold to the Imperial German Navy on 28 November 1914.

U-8 was renumbered by the Germans as U-67 when her class was redesignated as the Type U 66. The torpedo load was increased by a third, from 9 to 12, and the deck gun was upgraded from the  gun originally specified to an  Uk L/30 one.

Service career 
U-67 was launched on 15 May 1915. On 4 August, SM U-67 was commissioned into the Imperial German Navy under the command of Kapitänleutnant Erich von Rosenberg-Grusczyski. On 28 October 1915, U-67 was assigned to the IV. U-Halbflotille in which she remained for the duration of the war.

U-67s most successful month was April 1917, when she sank four ships of 15,223 GRT in a span of twelve days.

Nieland was succeeded as commander of U-67 by Oberleutnant zur See Helmuth von Rabenau in December 1917. Under his command during the last eleven months of the war, U-67 sank no more ships. During her service career under three commanders, U-67 had completed thirteen war patrols. She was surrendered to the British on 20 November 1918, nine days after the Armistice, and broken up at Fareham in 1921.

Ships sunk or damaged

Notes

References

Bibliography

External links

Photos of cruises of German submarine U-54 in 1916-1918.
A 44 min. German film from 1917 about a cruise of the German submarine U-35.
Room 40:  original documents, photos and maps about World War I German submarine warfare and British Room 40 Intelligence from The National Archives, Kew, Richmond, UK.

German Type U 66 submarines
U-boats commissioned in 1915
World War I submarines of Germany
1915 ships
Ships built in Kiel